Leo B. Hanley (April 27, 1908 – May 12, 1994) was an American jurist from Wisconsin.

Born in Milwaukee, Wisconsin, Hanley graduated from the Marquette University Law School and was an assistant city attorney for the city of Milwaukee. During World War II, Hanley served in the United States Navy. In 1953, he became a Milwaukee County Court judge later a  Wisconsin Circuit Court judge. In 1966, the Governor of Wisconsin Warren Knowles appointed Hanley to the Wisconsin Supreme Court. In 1968, Hanley was elected to a ten-year term retiring in 1978.

Notes

Lawyers from Milwaukee
Marquette University Law School alumni
Wisconsin state court judges
Justices of the Wisconsin Supreme Court
1908 births
1994 deaths
20th-century American judges
20th-century American lawyers